The R669 road is a regional road in County Waterford, Ireland. It travels from the R668 road to Cappoquin. The road for Mount Melleray Abbey leaves the R669 at Boola.

References

Regional roads in the Republic of Ireland
Roads in County Waterford